This is a list of courtesy titles used for the heirs of currently extant titles in the Peerages of England, Scotland, Great Britain, Ireland, and the United Kingdom. Asterisks denote courtesy titles currently used by living heirs.

Courtesy titles for heirs of dukes

Courtesy titles for heirs of marquesses

Courtesy titles for heirs of earls

See also
List of dukes in the peerages of Britain and Ireland
List of marquesses in the peerages of Britain and Ireland
List of earls

Notes

See also
Peerages in the United Kingdom

External links
 Debrett's, Peerages by Courtesy

List of courtesy titles in the peerages of Britain and Ireland
Titles in the United Kingdom
Peerages in the United Kingdom